Ignaz Matausch (September 1, 1859 – December 14, 1915) was an Austrian-American artist and entomologist known for his models of insects and other invertebrates at the American Museum of Natural History. Born in Budweis, he emigrated to the United States in 1892 and resided in Cleveland, Ohio, until 1904, when he became a member of the modeling staff of the American Museum. He was known for his realistic large-scale models including the flea, house fly, and spider. As an entomologist he focused on treehoppers (Membracidae), authoring eight papers on their biology.

References

1859 births
1915 deaths
People associated with the American Museum of Natural History
American entomologists
American sculptors
Animal artists
Austro-Hungarian emigrants to the United States